Tongaichthys robustus, the Tonga escolar, is a species of snake mackerel known from the Tonga Ridge near Fiji and off of Queensland, Australia from Flinders Reef. This species grows to a length of  SL. This species is the only known member of its genus.

References

External links
 Drawing

Gempylidae
Monotypic fish genera
Fish described in 1983